Grabenbach is a small river located in Bavaria, Germany.

The Grabenbach is a tributary of the Saalach. For the first  the river flows in an underground channel under the city of Bad Reichenhall.

History

The tunnel was built after plans of Erasmus Grasser from about 1524 to 1538. After the route has been determined in 1522, the construction was started in 1524 under the direction of master builder Fabian Zehentner and the supervision of the Salzmaier (supervisor of the saline) Hans Humbs. The tunnel was dug from north to south, towards the higher saline. Therefore, with progressing work one had to dug deeper and deeper; a gradient of  had to be compensated. In 1534, the well shaft was reached and in 1538 the construction work was finished.

Course

The Grabenbach begins in the old saline and reaches the surface again near the street Gewerkenstraße. Then it flows for another  through the Marzoller Au to the Saalach. At the Kurstraße street, one of the shafts was renovated. Through a glass plate one now can see the Grabenbach flowing in the deep. The river is passable by boat, at irregular intervals guided tours through the tunnel are offered for small groups.

Purpose

The Grabenbach leads intruding fresh water and water driving the wheels out of the galleries, so that it does not mix with the salty water. Today a part of the water is used for a water-treading basin in the pedestrian zone. Additionally, there are pipes in the canal that carry the brine to the graduation tower and the spa pump room. Also, rainwater of the pedestrian zone is led into the Grabenbach.

See also
List of rivers of Bavaria

Rivers of Bavaria
Rivers of Germany